The fifth and final season of the animated television series Teen Titans, based on the DC comics series of the same time by Bob Haney and Bruno Premiani, originally aired on Cartoon Network in the United States. Developed by Glen Murakami, Sam Register, and television writer David Slack. The series was produced by DC Entertainment and Warner Bros. Animation. 

The series focuses on a team of crime-fighting teenage superheroes, consisting of the leader Robin, alien princess Starfire, green shapeshifter Beast Boy, the dark sorceress Raven, and the technological genius Cyborg. This season focuses on Beast Boy as he deals with his past involving the Doom Patrol, and helps the Titans unite heroes to stop the Brotherhood of Evil.

The season premiered on September 24, 2005 and ran until January 16, 2006, broadcasting 13 episodes. Warner Bros. Home Video released the fifth season on DVD in the United States and Canada on July 22, 2008. Upon its release, the season received critical acclaim with many critics regarding it as the best season of the series. It was praised for its variety of storylines and its expanded cast of characters.

Production
Season five of Teen Titans aired on Cartoon Network from September 24, 2005 to January 16, 2006. The season was produced by DC Entertainment and Warner Bros. Animation, executive produced by Sander Schwartz and produced by Glen Murakami, Bruce Timm and Linda M. Steiner. Staff directors for the series included Michael Chang, Ben Jones and Alex Soto. The episodes for the season were written by a team of writers, which consisted of Richard Elliott, Melody Fox, Rob Hoegee, Greg Klein, Thomas Pugsley, Simon Racioppa, David Slack, and Amy Wolfram. Producer Murakami worked with Derrick Wyatt, Brianne Drouhard, and Jon Suzuki on character design while Hakjoon Kang served as the background designer for the series. The season employed a number of storyboard artists, including Eric Canete, Colin Heck, Kalvin Lee, Keo Thongkham, Scooter Tidwell, Alan Wan and Matt Youngberg.

Cast and characters

The five voice actors for the main characters - Scott Menville, Hynden Walch, Greg Cipes, Tara Strong, and Khary Payton - reprise their roles in the fifth season as Robin, Starfire, Beast Boy, Raven, and Cyborg, respectively. In addition to her role as Raven, Strong voiced Elasti-Girl in the two-part episode "Homecoming" and Kole in the episode "Kole". Walch also provided the voice for Madame Rouge, a main villain who is a part of the Brotherhood of Evil, and the character Teether in episode "Hide and Seek". Dee Bradley Baker recurs in the season, providing voices for several characters, including  Le Blanc, Gnarrk, Cinderblock, Silkie, and Wildebeest. Lauren Tom reprises her role as Jinx in three episodes of the season. Glenn Shadix appeared in the series, voicing the season's main villains The Brain and Monsieur Mallah. Freddy Rodriguez recurred in the season as hero twins Más y Menos.

Season five of Teen Titans featured numerous guest actors providing voices for recurring and guest characters. Diane Delano appeared in this season as Pantha in the eleventh and twelfth episodes of the season. Jason Marsden voiced characters Billy Numerous and Red Star in two episodes. Michael Rosenbaum voices the character Kid Flash in "Lightspeed" and "Titans Together". In the two-part episode "Homecoming", members of the Doom Patrol, Beast Boy's former team, appear. Xander Berkeley returns to the series, voicing Mento and Brotherhood of Evil member General Immortus. The episode also features the voices of Peter Onorati, voicing Robotman and Judge Reinhold, voicing Negative Man. The episode "For Real" features T'Keyah Crystal Keymáh, Mike Erwin and Wil Wheaton reprising their roles as Bumblebee, Speedy and Aqualad. Actor Ed O'Ross appeared in the episode "Snowblind" providing the voice for the Raskov. Veteran voice actor Rodger Bumpass, the voice of Squidward Tentacles in SpongeBob SquarePants, reprises his role of Dr. Light in the episode "Kole". The episode "Hide and Seek" features veteran voice actress Russi Taylor providing the voices of characters Timmy Tantrum and Melvin. Kevin Michael Richardson returns to the series, providing the voice for Mammoth and See-More in the episode "Lightspeed". In the episode "Revved Up", rock singer David Johansen voiced the villain Ding Dong Daddy Dowd. The episode "Go" features actor Gary Anthony Sturgis voicing the Gordanians and Trogaar. In the season finale "Things Change", Ashley Johnson and Ron Perlman reprise their roles as Terra and Slade respectively.

Reception
The season received critical acclaim. Mac McEntire of DVD Verdict awarded the fifth season story a score of 85, deeming it a "flat-out excellent final season." McEntire commended the show's evolution from season one, noting that the season features "smart, emotional and exciting stories within the context of Teen Titans", as well as the introduction of various new characters in the season from the world of the Teen Titans comics. John Sinnott, writing for DVD Talk, deemed the fifth season release as "Highly Recommended." Sinnott commented that with the expanded cast of villains and superheroes in the season, "the shows in this set never get dull." Sinnott also highlighted the alterations made on DC characters to fit within the series' context as a strong point. Sinnott concluded that the season is "stronger than the preceding season" and "hits all the right marks." Randall Cyrenne of Animated Views praised season five as the strongest season, noting that it found "a more even tone that allowed the season to feel cohesive."

Episodes

DVD release
The DVD boxset was released on July 22, 2008 in the United States and Canada. It features a series title Teen Titans: Know Your Foes, featurette which is segmented for each of the series main villains.

References

Teen Titans (TV series) seasons
2006 American television seasons